Sang Charak (also Romanized as Sang Chārak) is a village in Qaleh Asgar Rural District, Lalehzar District, Bardsir County, Kerman Province, Iran. At the 2006 census, its population was 45, in 7 families.

References 

Populated places in Bardsir County